Sangtam may be:
Sangtam Naga people
Sangtam language
Imtilemba Sangtam, Indian politician